Landing Gear is Devin the Dude's fifth studio album. It was released on October 7, 2008. It was his first studio album since signing with the label Razor & Tie. It features a high-profile guest appearance from Snoop Dogg. As of October 30, 2008, the album has sold 18,906 copies.

Track listing

Samples
I Don't Chase 'Em
"Don't Stop Loving Me Now" by L.T.D.

Chart positions

References

2008 albums
Devin the Dude albums
Razor & Tie albums
Albums produced by Cozmo